Toby Olubi (born 24 September 1987) is a British bobsledder. He competed in the four-man event at the 2018 Winter Olympics. Prior to appearing at the Olympics, he won £12,000 on Deal or No Deal.

References

External links
 

1987 births
Living people
British male bobsledders
Olympic bobsledders of Great Britain
Bobsledders at the 2018 Winter Olympics
Place of birth missing (living people)